DeWitt Clinton Wilson (May 14, 1827, Wakeman, Ohio – August 26, 1895, Mauston, Wisconsin) was a member of the Wisconsin State Assembly and the Wisconsin State Senate. From Sparta, Wisconsin, Wilson was a member of the Assembly in 1866 and of the Senate from 1867 to 1868. He was a Republican.

References

1827 births
1895 deaths
Republican Party Wisconsin state senators
Republican Party members of the Wisconsin State Assembly
People from Wakeman, Ohio
People from Sparta, Wisconsin
19th-century American politicians